Longeville is a commune in the Doubs department in the Bourgogne-Franche-Comté region in eastern France.

Geography
Longeville is a long, narrow village, as its name implies. It is the highest commune in the canton.

The cliffs of the Capucin and Mont Belvoir at 850 m dominate the valley of the Loue River.

Population

Economy
Cheese production is an important industry, particularly Comté, a hard cheese made of cow's milk similar to Gruyère.

See also
 Communes of the Doubs department

References

External links

 http://www.routedescommunes.com/departement-25-commune-319.html Longeville on the intercommunal Web site of the department] 

Communes of Doubs